Indian scout or Indian Scout may refer to:

 A reconnaissance, soldier or paramilitary that operates in the bush, or from a native population
 Historically, a Native American skilled in tracking
 United States Army Indian Scouts
 Indian Scout (motorcycle), a motorcycle built by the Indian Motorcycle Company
 a boy scout or girl scout who is American Indian, see American Indian Scouting Association
 a boy scout or girl scout from India, see Scouting and Guiding in India
 Ladakh Scouts, an infantry regiment of the Indian Army
 Davy Crockett, Indian Scout, 1950 Western film

See also
 Indian (disambiguation)
 Scout (disambiguation)
 Indian Guides (disambiguation)
 Indian auxiliaries